Scorpiurus muricatus, the caterpillar-plant or prickly scorpion's-tail, is an annual leguminous plant native to southern Europe and Greater Syria with tiny pea-like flowers and simple leaves uncharacteristic of a legume.  Its contorted, pubescent pods give rise to its common name "prickly caterpillar".  Extracts of the species have been found to have allelopathic effects on  microbes of the genus Fusarium due to the high concentration of phytoalexins in the plants' tissues.

This is mainly a garden plant used as a groundcover.  Its densely haired pods may be added to salads for interest, and its leaves used as a salad herb in some Mediterranean countries.

References

Loteae
Plants described in 1753
Taxa named by Carl Linnaeus
Flora of Malta